Edward Lasker (May 15, 1912 – July 11, 1997) was an American businessman and Thoroughbred racehorse owner.

Biography
He was one of the three children of Flora Warner and her husband, Albert Davis Lasker (1880-1952), the owner of Lord & Thomas, a highly successful Chicago advertising agency, who was also the owner of the Chicago Cubs Major League Baseball team. His sisters are Mary Lasker Block (1904-1981) and Frances Lasker Brody (1916–2009).

Edward Lasker graduated from Yale University in 1933. He then joined his father's advertising agency where he worked until 1942 when he joined the U.S. Navy and served in the Pacific. In 1935, he married Gimbels department-store heiress Caral Gimbel (daughter of Bernard Gimbel), but the marriage ended in divorce and Caral wed baseball star Hank Greenberg in 1946.

After the war (by which time his father had left the advertising  business), Edward Lasker moved to the West Coast of the United States where he became a film producer in Hollywood. In 1947, Lasker married actress Jane Greer with whom he had three children: Alex and Lawrence Lasker (both screenwriters and producers) and Steven Lasker. In 1963, Lasker married Cynthia Stone Palmer.

In 1929, Lasker became involved in Thoroughbred horse racing as an owner/breeder. After his marriage, his wife also became a race horse owner. At age forty, he went back to university to study for a law degree. After graduating in 1955 from the University of California in Los Angeles he began practicing law and served for many years on the boards of directors of Phillip Morris, Inc. and Great Western Financial.

Edward Lasker died in Los Angeles on July 11, 1997, aged 85.

References

Sources
 Ingham, John N. Biographical Dictionary of American Business Leaders (1983) Greenwood Press 

1912 births
1997 deaths
Yale University alumni
UCLA School of Law alumni
American people of German-Jewish descent
American racehorse owners and breeders
Businesspeople from Chicago
20th-century American lawyers
20th-century American businesspeople
Gimbel family